Llorenç "Sito" Riera Ortega (born 5 January 1987) is a Spanish professional footballer who plays as an attacking midfielder.

A youth and reserve player at Barcelona and Espanyol, he never featured professionally in his own country, going on to spend over a decade abroad. He played top-flight football in Greece, Ukraine, Kazakhstan, Poland and Cyprus.

Club career
Born in Manacor, Balearic Islands, Riera represented both major clubs in Barcelona, FC Barcelona and RCD Espanyol, but never made it past their reserve sides. In the 2007–08 season he suffered relegation from the Segunda División B with the latter, failing to score any goals in the process.

On 8 July 2009, after a loan experience with Panthrakikos FC, Riera signed for Panionios F.C. also of the Super League Greece. On 14 December 2011, he left by mutual consent.

Riera left FC Chornomorets Odesa – where he spent one and a half years, earning a late red card in his last game for the team, a 1–0 away win against PSV Eindhoven in the group stage of the UEFA Europa League– at the start of March 2014, due to the civil unrest caused by the Ukrainian revolution. On 23 June he moved to Kazakhstan, signing a three-and-a-half-year contract with FC Kairat.

On 1 April 2016, after three seasons of irregular playing time, Riera left the Almaty Central Stadium. He resumed his career that August with Śląsk Wrocław in the Polish Ekstraklasa, on a two-year deal.

After his stint in Poland, Riera moved to the Cypriot First Division, where he represented Enosis Neon Paralimni FC and AEL Limassol.

Personal life
Riera's older brother Albert was also a footballer. A winger, he represented, amongst others, Espanyol, Liverpool and the Spain national team.

Career statistics

Honours
Kairat
Kazakhstan Cup: 2014, 2015
Kazakhstan Super Cup: 2016

References

External links

1987 births
Living people
Sportspeople from Manacor
Spanish footballers
Footballers from Mallorca
Association football midfielders
Segunda División B players
Tercera División players
FC Barcelona C players
FC Barcelona Atlètic players
RCD Espanyol B footballers
Super League Greece players
Super League Greece 2 players
Panthrakikos F.C. players
Panionios F.C. players
Anagennisi Karditsa F.C. players
Ukrainian Premier League players
FC Chornomorets Odesa players
Kazakhstan Premier League players
FC Kairat players
Ekstraklasa players
Śląsk Wrocław players
Cypriot First Division players
Enosis Neon Paralimni FC players
AEL Limassol players
Spanish expatriate footballers
Expatriate footballers in Greece
Expatriate footballers in Ukraine
Expatriate footballers in Kazakhstan
Expatriate footballers in Poland
Expatriate footballers in Cyprus
Spanish expatriate sportspeople in Greece
Spanish expatriate sportspeople in Ukraine
Spanish expatriate sportspeople in Kazakhstan
Spanish expatriate sportspeople in Poland
Spanish expatriate sportspeople in Cyprus